Nilagiri State was one of the Princely States of India during the British Raj. It belonged to the Orissa States Agency and its capital was at Raj Nilgiri, which is the modern town of Nilagiri.

The state was bounded in the north and west by the State of Mayurbhanj and in the south by Balasore District.
In 1949 it was merged into Balasore District.

History
According to local traditions, Nilgiri state was founded by a mythical ancestor coming from the Chhota Nagpur region of the Nagabanshi dynasty. In 1525 Raja Narayan Singh distinguished himself by his service to Emperor Akbar in the battles against Afghan invaders. Between 1611 and 1797 there were seven successive rulers. During the rule of Raja Krishnachandra Mardraj Harichandan in 1850s, he adopted the son of the Bhanj king of Mayurbhanj, Krishna Chandra Bhanj Deo, who succeeded as the ruler of Nilgiri as Raja Shyamchandra Mardraj Harichandan in 1893.
 
During the time of the political integration of India freedom fighters such as Balaram Raj, Shyamsundar Parida, Kailashchandra Mohanty, Banamali Das, Baishnab Patnaik and Nanda Kishore Patnaik forced the last Raja of Nilgiri to surrender to the newly formed Indian National Government. The prince signed the accession to the Indian Union on 1 January 1948.

Rulers
The rulers of Nilgiri State. They bore the title of 'Raja', 'Rani' in the case of female ruler Chira Devi.

Narayan Singh Bhujang Mandhata Birat Basant Harichandan (1521-1564)
...
Ram Chandra Mardraj Harichandan (1797-1832)
Govind Chandra Mardraj Harichandan (1832-1833)
Rani Chira Devi - Regent (1833-1843)
Krishna Chandra Mardraj Harichandan (1843-1893)
Shyam Chandra Mardraj Harichandan (1893-6 Jul 1913)
Kishor Chandra Mardraj Harichandan (6 July 1913-1 January 1948)

Titular
Kishor Chandra Mardraj Harichandan (1 January 1948-29 March 1960)
Rajendra Chandra Mardraj Harichandan (29 March 1960-30 May 2001)
Jayant Chandra Mardraj Harichandan (30 May 2001-current)

References

External links

Princely states of Odisha
History of Odisha
Balasore district